Menalou vanilia fir honey is a honey produced in Greece with protected destination of origin status. It contains at least 80% honey of the which will be from the black pine, and the rest will be flower honey produced in the region (<20%) with a pleasant taste and a characteristic appearance with a light colour and sheen; moisture content 14–15.5%, sucrose content <10% (8–18%).

It is produced in 24 municipalities and communities within Arcadia (district of Gortynia and Mantineia; the municipalities of Dimitsana and Lagkadia; the communities of Valtesiniko, Vytina, Elati, Zigovisti, Kamenitsa, Lasta, Magouliana, Mygdalia, Nymfasia, Pyrgaki, Rados, Stemnitsa, Syrna, Alonistaina, Vlacherna, Kardaras, Kapsas, Lykochia, Piana, Roeino, Tselepakos, and Chrysovitsi.

References

Honey
Greek products with protected designation of origin